ALFA University College (formally known as Kolej Alif) is a private, international college located in Subang Jaya, Selangor, Malaysia. The college currently offers certificate and diploma programmes in design, education, and business. Since its inception in 1998, ALFA College has been recognized as a leading teaching center in the design fields which has structured its course work towards practical-skills development rather than conceptual learning. Graduates are sought after by employers because of their industry-readiness & service-first attitude (90% marketability rate), respectively.

History 
Established in 1998. ALFA University College (AUC) was formerly known as ALIF Creative Academy. ALFA University College was founded in 1998 as a 'boutique' design college in the Paramount Gardens district of Petaling Jaya and then relocated to its present site the heart Subang Jaya, SS 15, Subang Jaya, Selangor Darul Ehsan, in 2010. It has Unique and close-knit learning environment. In 2004, ALFA College came under the administration of the REAL Education Group and was officially renamed as ALFA International College in 2008. 

In 2017 ALFA has been taken over by Nusantara Education Group and has recorded a quantum leap in development of new programs, growing number of students and managed to upgrade its status to a university college in 2021, a major milestone achieved within 4 years after taken over by the Nusantara. Here in 2021, ALFA transformed into a University College as approved by the Ministry of Higher Education Malaysia (MOHE)/Kementerian Pendidikan Tinggi (KPT) spearheaded by AUC Chairman, Dr. Shaharuddin Bin Mohd Satha and Mr Fairuz bin Kamarulzaman (Managing Director).

In December 2022, Professor Abdul Malek Tambi has joined on board as the AUC's Vice Chancellor.  Moving forward, many significant developments will take place to meet the requirements of a full university status by year 2026 - 2027.

AUC is certified to ISO9001:2015 Quality Management System standard by Bureau of Veritas.

ALFA offers programmes ranging from Foundation, Diploma, Bachelor's Degree, Master's Degree and PhD. 

We also offer SKM (Sijil Kemahiran Malaysia) and DKM (Diploma Kemahiran Malaysia) courses on skill-based disciplines to support the lifelong learning for Malaysian and international students. Our students come from more than 35 countries.

ALFA University College expanded its course to include early childhood education as well as Business Management and English Language. The AUC University College's expansion into various fields was part of a national effort underway in Malaysia to upgrade the quality of its education and to become International Education Hub by the year 2025.

See also 
 List of private college-universities in Malaysia
 List of international architecture schools
 List of architecture schools

References

External links 

 

Colleges in Malaysia
Universities and colleges in Selangor
Educational institutions established in 1998
1998 establishments in Malaysia
Cambridge schools in Malaysia